For National Unity (За Народно Јединство, Za Narodno Jednistvo) was a political coalition in Serbia. 
At the last legislative elections, 28 December 2003, the alliance won 1.7% of the popular vote and no seats. The alliance was formed by the Party of Serbian Unity, People's Peasant Party, People's Party, Radovan Radović's Our Home Serbia, and the Serb Party.

References

Defunct political party alliances in Serbia